Sergio Orduña Carrillo (born 4 April 1954) is a Mexican football manager and was a former manager Altamira of Ascenso MX.

Career
Orduña was a star football player for Tigres before becoming a manager.

See also
List of people from Morelos, Mexico

References

External links

DT profile at Medio Tiempo

1954 births
Living people
Mexico international footballers
Footballers from Morelos
Club Atlético Zacatepec players
Tigres UANL footballers
Club Puebla players
Correcaminos UAT footballers
Mexican football managers
C.F. Monterrey managers
Club León managers
C.D. Veracruz managers
FC Juárez managers
Association footballers not categorized by position
Mexican footballers